Smoky View Township is a township in Saline County, Kansas, in the United States.

Smoky View Township was organized in 1876.

References

Townships in Saline County, Kansas
Townships in Kansas